Klaus-Dieter Bieler (born 5 January 1949) is a former German track and field athlete, who competed for West Germany in the 1976 Summer Olympics, taking part in the men's 100 metres and 4 × 100 metres relay events.

Bieler competed for the clubs Eintracht Braunschweig and TV Wattenscheid. His biggest success was winning the bronze medal in the 100 metres event at the 1974 European Athletics Championships.

References 

1949 births
Living people
Sportspeople from Braunschweig
German male sprinters
West German male sprinters
Olympic athletes of West Germany
Athletes (track and field) at the 1976 Summer Olympics
European Athletics Championships medalists
Eintracht Braunschweig athletes
TV Wattenscheid athletes
Universiade medalists in athletics (track and field)
Universiade bronze medalists for West Germany